The Breeders 2YO Colt & Gelding Trot is a harness racing event for two-year-old Standardbred male trotters. It is one part of the Breeders Crown annual series of twelve races for both Standardbred trotters and pacers. First run in 1985, it is contested over a distance of one mile. Race organizers have awarded the event to various racetracks across North America. The 2017 race will be held at Hoosier Park in Anderson, Indiana, United States.

Historical race events
On October 5, 1984 at The Red Mile in Lexington, Kentucky, Workaholic became the first ever Breeders Crown champion when he won the run-off for the 2YO Colt & Gelding Trot. Owned by an American racing partnership headed by Paul Heineken & Paul Ewell of Ocean City, Maryland, Workaholic was driven and trained by Swedes Berndt Lindstedt and Jan Johnson.

In 2010, Pocono Downs became the first venue to host all 12 events on a single night.

North American Locations
Woodbine Racetrack (Wdb) Ontario (9)
Pompano Park (Ppk) Florida (7)
Meadowlands Racetrack (Mxx) New Jersey (6)
Mohawk Raceway (Moh) Ontario (5)
Garden State Park (Gsp) New Jersey (1)
Pocono Downs (Pcd) Pennsylvania (2)
Colonial Downs (Cln) Virginia (1) 
The Meadows Racetrack (Mea) Pennsylvania (1)
The Red Mile (Lex) Kentucky (1)

Records
 Most wins by a driver
 4 – John Campbell (1985, 1986, 1993, 2002)

 Most wins by a trainer
 5 –   Jimmy Takter (1996, 2004, 2011, 2013, 2014)

 Stakes record
 1:53 0/0 – Walner (2016)

Winners of the Breeders Crown 2YO Colt & Gelding Trot

See also
List of Breeders Crown Winners

External links
YouTube Video - Workaholic wins 1984 Breeders Crown 2YO Trot

References

Recurring sporting events established in 1984
Breeders Crown
Harness racing in the United States
Harness racing in Canada
Horse races in Florida
Horse races in New Jersey
Horse races in Ontario
Horse races in Pennsylvania
Horse races in Virginia